The Beechcraft Model 18 (or "Twin Beech", as it is also known) is a 6- to 11-seat, twin-engined, low-wing, tailwheel light aircraft manufactured by the Beech Aircraft Corporation of Wichita, Kansas. Continuously produced from 1937 to November 1969 (over 32 years, a world record at the time), over 9,000 were built, making it one of the world's most widely used light aircraft. Sold worldwide as a civilian executive, utility, cargo aircraft, and passenger airliner on tailwheels, nosewheels, skis, or floats, it was also used as a military aircraft.

During and after World War II, over 4,500 Beech 18s were used in military service—as light transport, light bomber (for China), aircrew trainer (for bombing, navigation, and gunnery), photo-reconnaissance, and "mother ship" for target drones—including United States Army Air Forces (USAAF) C-45 Expeditor, AT-7 Navigator, and AT-11 Kansan; and United States Navy (USN) UC-45J Navigator, SNB-1 Kansan, and others.  In World War II, over 90% of USAAF bombardiers and navigators trained in these aircraft.

In the early postwar era, the Beech 18 was the pre-eminent "business aircraft" and "feeder airliner". Besides carrying passengers, its civilian uses have included aerial spraying, sterile insect release, fish stocking, dry-ice cloud seeding, aerial firefighting, air-mail delivery, ambulance service, numerous movie productions, skydiving, freight, weapon- and drug-smuggling, engine testbed, skywriting, banner towing, and stunt aircraft. Many are privately owned, around the world, with 240 in the U.S. still on the FAA Aircraft Registry in August  2017.

Design and development

By the late 1930s, Beechcraft management speculated that a demand would exist for a new design dubbed the Model 18, which would have a military application, and increased the main production facilities.  The design was mainly conventional for the time, including twin radial engines, all-metal semimonocoque construction with fabric-covered control surfaces, and tailwheel undercarriage. Less conventional was the twin-tailfin configuration. The Model 18 can be mistaken for the larger Lockheed Electra series of airliners, which closely resemble it. Early production aircraft were powered either by two 330-hp (250-kW) Jacobs L-6s or 350-hp (260-kW) Wright R-760Es. The 450-hp (336-kW) Pratt & Whitney R-985 became the definitive engine from the prewar C18S onwards. The Beech 18 prototype first flew on January 15, 1937.

The aircraft has used a variety of engines and has had a number of airframe modifications to increase gross weight and speed.  At least one aircraft was modified to a 600-hp (447-kW) Pratt & Whitney R-1340 powerplant configuration. With the added weight of about 200 lb (91 kg) per engine, the concept of a Model 18 fitted with R-1340 engines was deemed unsatisfactory due to the weakest structural area of the aircraft being the engine mounts. Nearly every airframe component has been modified.

In 1955, deliveries of the Model E18S commenced; the E18S featured a fuselage that was extended  higher for more headroom in the passenger cabin. All later Beech 18s (sometimes called Super 18s) featured this taller fuselage, and some earlier models (including one AT-11) have been modified to this larger fuselage. The Model H18, introduced in 1963, featured optional tricycle undercarriage. Unusually, the undercarriage was developed for earlier-model aircraft under an STC by Volpar, and installed in H18s at the factory during manufacture. A total of 109 H18s was built with tricycle undercarriage, and another 240 earlier-model aircraft were modified with this.

Construction of the Beechcraft Model 18 ended in 1970 with a final Model H18 going to Japan Airlines. Through the years, 32 variations of the basic design had flown, over 200 improvement modification kits were developed, and almost 8,000 aircraft were built. In one case, the aircraft was modified to a triple tail, trigear, humpbacked configuration and appeared similar to a miniature Lockheed Constellation. Another distinctive conversion was carried out by Pacific Airmotive as the PacAero Tradewind. This featured a lengthened nose to accommodate the tricycle nosewheel, and the Model 18's twin tailfins were replaced by a single fin.

Operational history

Production got an early boost when Nationalist China paid the company US$750,000 for six M18R light bombers, but by the time of the U.S. entry into World War II, only 39 Model 18s had been sold, of which 29 were for civilian customers. Work began in earnest on a variant specifically for training United States Army Air Forces (USAAF) military pilots, bombardiers, and navigators. The effort resulted in the Army AT-7. Further development led to the AT-11 navigation trainer, C-45 military transport, and F-2 (the "F" standing for "Fotorecon", short for "photographic reconnaissance"). The United States Navy first adopted the Beech 18 as the JRB-1, equivalent to the F-2, followed by the JRB-2 transport; the JRB was initially named the Voyager, but this name did not enter common use, and JRBs were generally called Expeditors like their USAAF counterparts. The first JRB-1 obtained by the Navy, bureau number (BuNo) 09771, was converted from the last civil Model 18 built before production was earmarked solely for the military for the duration of the war. The Navy subsequently obtained more Model 18s as the JRB-3 (C-45B), JRB-4 (UC-45F), SNB-1 Kansan (AT-11), SNB-2 (AT-7), and SNB-2C (AT-7C). Existing naval Twin Beeches were subsequently modified into the SNB-2H air ambulance, SNB-2P reconnaissance trainer, and SNB-3Q electronic countermeasures trainer.  The United States Coast Guard acquired seven JRB-4 and JRB-5 aircraft from the Navy between 1943 and 1947; they were primarily used as utility transports, with one aircraft later converted for aerial mapping, and another used for proficiency flying.

After the war, the USAAF became the United States Air Force (USAF), and the USAF Strategic Air Command had Model 18 variants (AT-11 Kansans, C-45 Expeditors, F-2 Expeditors, and UC-45 Expeditors) from 1946 until 1951. In 1950, the Navy still had around 1,200 JRB and SNB aircraft in inventory. From 1951 to 1955, the USAF had many of its aircraft remanufactured with new fuselages, wing center sections, and undercarriages to take advantage of the improvements to the civil models since the end of World War II. Eventually, 900 aircraft were remanufactured to be similar to the then-current Model D18S and given new designations, constructor's numbers, and Air Force serial numbers. The USN had many of its surviving aircraft remanufactured as well, resulting in the JRB-6, the SNB-5, and SNB-5P. The Coast Guard retired its JRBs in 1956 and sold most of them as surplus in 1959, but one was retained by the United States Coast Guard Reserve until at least 1972. With the adoption of the 1962 United States Tri-Service aircraft designation system, the Navy's SNB-5 and SNB-5P became the TC-45J and RC-45J respectively, later becoming the UC-45J as their primary mission shifted from aircrew training to utility transport work. The C-45 flew in USAF service until 1963, the USN retired its last UC-45J in 1972, while the U.S. Army flew its C-45s until 1976. In later years, the military called these aircraft "bug smashers" in reference to their extensive use supplying mandatory flight hours for desk-bound aviators in the Pentagon.

Beech 18s were used extensively by Air America during the Vietnam War; initially more-or-less standard ex-military C-45 examples were used, but then the airline had 12 aircraft modified by Conrad Conversions in 1963 and 1964 to increase performance and load-carrying capacity. The increase was achieved by several airframe modifications, including increased horizontal stabilizer angle-of-incidence, redesigned undercarriage doors, and aerodynamically improved wingtips.

Spar problems

The wing spar of the Model 18 was fabricated by welding an assembly of tubular steel. The configuration of the tubes in combination with drilled holes from aftermarket STC modifications on some of these aircraft have allowed the spar to become susceptible to corrosion and cracking while in service. This prompted the FAA to issue an Airworthiness Directive in 1975, mandating the fitting of a spar strap to some Model 18s. This led, in turn, to the retirement of a large number of STC-modified Model 18s when owners determined the aircraft were worth less than the cost of the modifications. The corrosion on unmodified spars was not a problem; it occurred due to the additional exposed surface area created through the STC hole-drilling process. Further requirements have been mandated by the FAA and other national airworthiness authorities, including regular removal of the spar strap to allow the strap to be checked for cracks and corrosion and the spar to be X-rayed. In Australia, the airworthiness authority has placed a life limit on the airframe, beyond which aircraft are not allowed to fly.

Variants

Manufacturer models
Unless otherwise noted, the engines fitted are Pratt & Whitney R-985 radials.

Model 18A

Model S18A
Version of Model 18A capable of being fitted with skis or Edo 55-7170 floats; MTOW: 

Model A18A
Version fitted with Wright R-760E-2 engines, MTOW: 

Model SA18A
Seaplane version of Model A18A, MTOW: 

Model 18B
Version powered with  Jacobs L-5 engines. Four built.

Model S18B
Version of Model 18B capable of being fitted with skis or floats.

Model 18D
Twelve aircraft built.

Model S18D

Model A18D

Model SA18D
Seaplane version of Model A18D, but same MTOW as S18D.

Model 18R
Model with Pratt and Whitney R-985, seven built, one to Sweden as an air ambulance, six to Nationalist China as M18R light bombers

Model 18S
Nine-passenger pre-World War II civil variant, powered by  served as basis for USAAF C-45C

Model B18S
Nine-passenger pre-World War II civil variant, served as basis for USAAF F-2

Model C18S
Variant of B18S with seating for eight passengers, and equipment and minor structural changes

Model D18S

Model D18C

Model E18S

Model E18S-9700

Model G18S

Model G18S-9150

Model H18

Military versions

USAAC/USAAF designations
C-45
Six-seat staff transport based on C18S; 11 built

C-45A
Eight-seat utility transport based on C18S; 20 built

RC-45A
Redesignation of all surviving F-2, F-2A, and F-2B aircraft by the USAF in 1948

C-45B
Based on C18S, but with modified internal layout; 223 ordered, redesignated UC-45B in 1943

C-45C
Two Model 18S aircraft impressed into the USAAF, redesignated UC-45C in January 1943

C-45D
Designation given to two AT-7 aircraft converted as passenger transports during manufacture, redesignated UC-45D in January 1943

C-45E
Designation given to two AT-7 and four AT-7B aircraft converted as passenger transports during manufacture, redesignated UC-45E in January 1943

C-45F
Standardized seven-seat version based on C18S, with longer nose than preceding models; 1,137 ordered, redesignated UC-45F

C-45G
AT-7s and AT-11s remanufactured in the early 1950s for the USAF to similar standard as civil D18S with autopilot and R-985-AN-3 engines; 372 aircraft rebuilt

TC-45G
Multiengine crew trainer variant of C-45G; AT-7s and AT-11s remanufactured in the early 1950s for the USAF to similar standard as civil D18S, 96 aircraft rebuilt
C-45H
AT-7s and AT-11s remanufactured in the early 1950s for the USAF to similar standard as civil D18S, with no autopilot and R-985-AN-14B engines; 432 aircraft rebuilt

TC-45H 

RC-45J 
In 1962, all surviving U.S. Navy SNB-5Ps were redesignated RC-45J

TC-45J 
In 1962 all surviving U.S. Navy SNB-5s were redesignated TC-45J

UC-45J 
Subsequent redesignation of RC-45J and TC-45J

AT-7 Navigator
Navigation trainer based on C18S, with an astrodome and positions for three students, powered by 450-hp Pratt & Whitney R-985-25 engines;  577 built

AT-7A
Floatplane version of AT-7; six built

AT-7B
Winterised AT-7; nine built

AT-7C
Based on C18S with R-985-AN3 engines; 549 built

AT-11 Kansan
Bombing and gunnery trainer for USAAF derived from AT-7, fuselage had small, circular cabin windows, bombardier position in nose, and bomb bay; gunnery trainers were also fitted with two or three .30-caliber machine guns, early models (the first 150 built) had a single .30-cal AN-M2 in a Beechcraft-manufactured top turret, later models used a Crocker Wheeler twin .30-cal top turret, a bottom tunnel gun was used for tail gunner training, 1,582 built for USAAF orders, with 24 ordered by Netherlands repossessed by USAAF and used by the Royal Netherlands Military Flying School at Jackson, Mississippi.

AT-11A
Conversion of AT-11 as navigation trainer; 36 converted

CQ-3
Conversion of UC-45F, modified to act as drone control aircraft, redesignated as DC-45F in June 1948

F-2
Photo-reconnaissance version based on B18

F-2A
Improved version

F-2B

US Navy designations

JRB-1
Photographic aircraft, based on the C18S, fitted with fairing over cockpit for improved visibility, 11 obtained, at least one conversion from impressed civil B18S

JRB-2
Light transport, based on the C18S; 15 obtained, at least one conversion from JRB-1, some transferred from USAAF C-45A stocks

JRB-3
Photographic version, similar to C-45B;  23 obtained, some transferred from USAAF C-45B stocks

JRB-4
Utility transport version, equivalent to UC-45F; 328 obtained from USAAF

JRB-6
Remanufactured JRB

SNB-1
Similar to AT-11; 110 built

SNB-2
Navigation trainer similar to AT-7, 299 built

SNB-2C
Navigation trainer similar to AT-7C, 375 built

SNB-2H
Ambulance conversion

SNB-2P
Photo-reconnaissance trainer conversion

SNB-3Q
Electronic countermeasures trainer conversion

SNB-5 
Remanufactured SNB or JRB

SNB-5P 
Remanufactured SNB-2P

RAF/RCAF Lend-lease designations
Expeditor I C-45Bs supplied to the RAF under Lend-Lease
Expeditor II C-45Fs supplied to the RAF and Royal Navy under Lend-Lease
Expeditor III C-45Fs supplied to the RCAF under Lend-Lease

Post-war RCAF designations
C-45Ds delivered between 1951 and 1952
Expeditor 3N navigation trainer - 88 built
Expeditor 3NM navigational trainer that could be converted to a transport - 59 built
Expeditor 3NMT 3NM converted to a transport aircraft - 67 built
Expeditor 3NMT(Special) navigation trainer/personnel transport - 19 built
Expeditor 3TM transport with fittings so it could be converted to a navigation trainer - 44 built
Expeditor 3TM(Special) modified RCAF Expeditors used overseas in conjunction with Project WPB6 - three built

Canadian Armed Forces
CT-128 Expeditor 1968 redesignation of existing RCAF aircraft upon unification of the Canadian Armed Forces

Conversions

Conrad 9800
Modification increasing the gross weight to 9,800 pounds with a single piece windshield 
Dumod I
 Executive conversion with Volpar tricycle landing gear, new wing tips, enlarged fight deck and refurbished 6–7 seat cabin with larger windows. Originally named Infinité I. 37 converted by 1966.
Dumod Liner
Stretched airliner conversion. Originally named Infinité II.
Hamilton HA-1
conversion of a TC-45J aircraft
Hamilton Little Liner
Modification of D18S with aerodynamic improvements and new, retractable tailwheel, capable of carrying 11 seats
Hamilton Westwind
Turboprop conversions with various engines

Hamilton Westwind II STD Stretched conversion powered by two 840-hp PT6As, and with accommodation for up to 17 passengers
Hamilton Westwind IIItwo 579-hp  PT6A-20s or 630-hp  PT6A-27s or 630-hp Lycoming LTS101s.
Hamilton Westwind IVtwo 570-hp Lycoming LTP101s or 680-hp PT6A-28s or 750-hp PT6A-34s or 1020-hp PT6A-45s
PacAero Tradewind
Conversion of Beech D18S/C-45 to five- to 11-seat executive transport with single fin by Pacific Airmotive
Rausch Star 250
Built as C-45F 44-47231, this aircraft was re-manufactured at Wichita by Beech in 1952, to become TC-45G 51-11544. From 1959 Rausch Engineering Inc. of South San Francisco, California, converted N8186H to tricycle undercarriage, using forward retracting main gear from a P-51 and rearward-retracting nose-leg from a T-28, adding a  nose extension,  rear fuselage extension, re-roofed fuselage for increased headroom and enlarged cabin windows. The modifications did not obtain FAA certification despite 58 hours of flight testing, with the aircraft eventually being broken up at Antioch, CA, in 1978.
SFERMA-Beechcraft PD.18S
Modification of Beech 18S powered by two Turboméca Bastan turboprops
Volpar (Beechcraft) Model 18
Conversion of Model 18 with nosewheel undercarriage
Volpar (Beechcraft) Super 18
Volpar (Beechcraft) Super Turbo 18
2x  Garrett TPE331
Volpar (Beechcraft) C-45G
C-45G aircraft modified with tricycle undercarriage
Volpar (Beechcraft) Turboliner
 15-passenger version of the Turbo 18 with extended fuselage, powered by 2 705-hp Garrett TPE331-1-101Bs
Volpar (Beechcraft) Turboliner II
Turboliners modified to meet SFAR 23

Operators

Civil
, the Beechcraft Model 18 remains popular with air charter companies and small feeder airlines worldwide.

Military

 Argentine Air Force
 Argentine Naval Aviation

Bolivian Air Force

 Brazilian Air Force

Royal Canadian Air Force 394 examples from 1941 to 1972
Royal Canadian Navy 10 examples from 1952 to 1960
 VX-10 Squadron
 VU-32 Squadron
Canadian Armed Forces

Chilean Air Force
Chilean Army
Chilean Navy

Colombian Air Force

Public Force of Costa Rica

Cuban Air Force - received two AT-7s, two AT-11s, a F-2B and a UC-45F in 1947 

Dominican Air Force

Ecuadorian Air Force

Air Force of El Salvador

French Air Force
French Naval Aviation

Guatemalan Air Force

Haiti Air Corps

Honduran Air Force

Indonesian Army
Indonesian National Police

Italian Air Force operated 125 aircraft  from 1949 until the 1970s

Japan Maritime Self-Defense Force
Japan Coast Guard

Mexican Air Force
Mexican Navy

Royal Netherlands Air Force
Dutch Naval Aviation Service

Nicaraguan Air Force

Niger Air Force

 Paraguayan Air Force

 Peruvian Air Force

Philippine Army Air Corps

Forca Aerea Portuguesa
Portuguese Navy
  
Somali Air Force – Withdrawn in 1991

 South African Air Force

Republic of Vietnam Air Force

Sri Lanka Air Force

Swedish Air Force

Swiss Air Force

Republic of China Air Force

Royal Thai Air Force

Tongan Maritime Force Air Force

Turkish Air Force

Royal Air Force
Royal Navy – Fleet Air Arm 76 Lend-Lease
701 Naval Air Squadron
712 Naval Air Squadron
723 Naval Air Squadron
724 Naval Air Squadron
728 Naval Air Squadron
730 Naval Air Squadron
739 Naval Air Squadron
742 Naval Air Squadron
755 Naval Air Squadron
781 Naval Air Squadron
782 Naval Air Squadron
791 Naval Air Squadron

United States Army
United States Army Air Corps
United States Army Air Forces
United States Air Force
United States Coast Guard
United States Coast Guard Reserve
United States Marine Corps
United States Navy

Uruguayan Air Force

Venezuelan Air Force

Zairian Air Force

Accidents and incidents
The Beechcraft Model 18 family has been involved in the following notable accidents and incidents:
April 25, 1951: Cubana de Aviación Flight 493, a Douglas DC-4 bound from Miami to Havana, registration CU-T188, collided with a U.S. Navy SNB-1, bureau number 39939, on a practice instrument approach to Naval Air Station Key West. The collision and ensuing crashes killed all 34 passengers and five crew aboard the DC-4 and all five crew aboard the SNB. The accident occurred at midday, weather was clear with unlimited visibility, and both flight crews had been cleared to fly under visual flight rules, being expected to "see and avoid" other aircraft; the student flying the SNB was wearing view-limiting goggles, but the other SNB crew were not, and were expected to keep watch. Ground witnesses said that neither aircraft took evasive action prior to the collision, and the Civil Aeronautics Board attributed the accident to the failure of both flight crews to see and avoid conflicting air traffic.
1967: Mohammed bin Awad bin Laden was killed in the crash of a Beechcraft 18 in Saudi Arabia.
December 10, 1967: American soul music singer Otis Redding, four members of his backing band the Bar-Kays, the pilot, and another member of Redding's entourage were killed in the crash of Redding's H18, registration N390R, into Lake Monona on approach to Truax Field in Wisconsin. The National Transportation Safety Board (NTSB) was unable to determine the cause of the crash, noting that the left engine and propeller were not recovered. Trumpet player Ben Cauley, the sole survivor of the crash, subsequently revived the Bar-Kays together with another band member who was aboard a different aircraft.
September 20, 1973: American folk music singer-songwriter Jim Croce, four members of his entourage, and the pilot were killed when their chartered E18S, registration N50JR,  crashed into a tree on takeoff from Natchitoches Regional Airport in Louisiana. The NTSB attributed the accident to reduced visibility due to fog, and to physical impairment of the pilot, who had severe coronary artery disease and had run  to the airport. An investigation conducted for a lawsuit against the charter company attributed the accident solely to pilot error, citing his downwind takeoff into a "black hole" of severe darkness, causing him to experience spatial disorientation.
September 26, 1978: Air Caribbean Flight 309, an air taxi flight by a D18S, registration N500L, crashed on approach to Isla Verde International Airport in Puerto Rico, killing the pilot and the five passengers aboard the aircraft and causing substantial property damage and injuries to bystanders on the ground. The pilot could not communicate with approach control and was following directions relayed by local tower controllers, who told the pilot to make a turn and maintain separation from a Lockheed L-1011 that was overtaking the flight, but the pilot did not turn, and the D18S passed underneath and very close to the L-1011. Both the NTSB and a U.S. District Court ruling attributed the crash to the D18S pilot's failure to correctly follow visual flight rules and air traffic control instructions to maintain separation from the much larger L-1011, causing a loss of aircraft control due to wake turbulence. A contributing factor was the pilot's difficulties in communication with controllers.
July 4, 1987: Ten people, including all then-current members of The Montana Band, were killed when the pilot of their chartered D18S, N132E, failed to clear a hillside near Lakeside, Montana, while performing a flypast of the venue where the band had performed earlier. The pilot performed an "abrupt" climb and performed a "hammerhead stall" maneuver, reversing direction and entering a dive. The accident was attributed to the pilot's poor judgment and failure to maintain altitude during unauthorized attempted aerobatics.

Aircraft on display

Argentina
 AT-11A 3495 – at the Museo Nacional de Aeronáutica de Argentina in Buenos Aires.
 C-45H 5621 – at the Museo Nacional de Aeronáutica de Argentina in Buenos Aires.
 C-45H AF-555 –  at the Museo Nacional de Aeronáutica de Argentina in Buenos Aires.
  H18S c/no. BA-752 (former LV-JFH) – at the Museo Nacional de Aeronáutica de Argentina in Buenos Aires.

Australia
 E18S c/no. BA-81 (former N3781B) - at the Queensland Air Museum in Caloundra, Queensland.

Belgium
 3NM floatplane c/no CA-191 (former C-FGNR) – at Pairi Daiza.

Brazil
 AT-11 4615 - at the Museu Aeroespacial in Rio de Janeiro, Brazil.
 C-45F 2856 - at the Museu Aeroespacial in Rio de Janeiro, Brazil.

Canada
 C-45H 459 – at the Canadian Bushplane Heritage Centre in Sault Ste. Marie, Ontario. Tail code CF-MJY
 3TM 8034 – at the Canadian Bushplane Heritage Centre in Sault Ste. Marie, Ontario.
 D18S c/no. A-141 (former CF-MPH) – at the RCMP Academy, Depot Division in Regina, Saskatchewan.
 D18S c/no. A-142 (former CF-MPI) – at the Bomber Command Museum of Canada in Nanton, Alberta.
 D18S c/no. A-156 – at the Canadian Warplane Heritage Museum in Hamilton, Ontario.
 3N c/no. A-652 (former RCAF 1477) – at the Royal Aviation Museum of Western Canada in Winnipeg, Manitoba.
 3NMT c/no. A-700 – at the Canadian Air Land Sea Museum at Toronto/Markham Airport in Markham, Ontario.
 3NM c/no. A-710 – at the North Atlantic Aviation Museum in Gander, Newfoundland and Labrador.
 3NMT c/no. A-782 (former CF-CKT) – at the Canadian Museum of Flight in Langley, British Columbia.
 3NMT c/no. A-872 – at the TransCanada Highway in Ignace, Ontario.
 3NM c/no. A-895 – at the Alberta Aviation Museum in Edmonton, Alberta.

Chile
 D18S c/no. A-1024 (former FACh 465) – at the Museo Aeronautico y del Espacio in Santiago, Chile.

India
 D18S VT-CNY former aircraft of the Raja of Mayurbhanj and later sold to Coal India Limited- at the Hotel Mayfair Lagoon in Bhubaneswar, Orissa.

Italy
 C-45F 6668 – suspended inside the Olbia Costa Smeralda Airport passenger terminal in Olbia, Sardinia. This was the first aircraft owned by Alisarda Airlines and was used in the filming of the movie The Last Emperor.

Malta
  C-45H 8304 – under restoration at the Malta Aviation Museum in Ta' Qali, Malta.

Mexico 

 UC-45J Expeditor "ETL-1320" (S/N): 18 - at the Museo Militar de Aviación.

Netherlands
 C-45G 51-11665 – at the Aviodrome in Lelystad, Netherlands.

New Zealand
 AT-11 3691 - at the Museum of Transport and Technology in Auckland, New Zealand.

Portugal
 AT-11 2504 - at the Museu do Ar in  Sintra, Portugal.

Spain
 C-45H AF-752– at Fundación Infante de Orleans in Madrid, Spain.

Turkey
 AT-11 Kansan 6390/9-930 – at Istanbul Aviation Museum.

United Kingdom
 E18S G-ASUG c/no. BA-111 – at the National Museum of Flight in East Lothian, Scotland.

United States
 AT-11 41‐27561 – at the National Museum of the USAF in Dayton, Ohio. or 42-37493
 AT-11B 41-27616 – at the Travis Air Force Base Heritage Center at Travis AFB, California.
 AT-11 42-36887 – at the Barksdale Global Power Museum in Bossier City, Louisiana.
 AT-11 42-37240 – at the Lone Star Flight Museum in Galveston, Texas.
 UC-45 42-37496 – at the Wings Over the Rockies Air and Space Museum in Denver, Colorado. This aircraft was originally an AT-11 before being remanufactured.

 UC-45F 44-47342 – at the Alaska Aviation Heritage Museum in Anchorage, Alaska.
 C-45G 51-11467 – at the EAA Chapter 1241 Air Museum at the Florida Keys Marathon Airport in Marathon, Florida.
 TC-45H 51-11529 – at the Tri-State Warbird Museum in Batavia, Ohio.
 C-45H 51-11696 – at the Museum of Flight in Seattle, Washington.
 C-45G 51-11795 – at the Air Mobility Command Museum in Dover, Delaware.
 C-45G 51-11897 – at the Castle Air Museum in Atwater, California.
 C-45H 52-10539 – at the 1941 Historical Aircraft Group Museum in Geneseo, New York.
 C-45H 52-10865 – at the Travis Air Force Base Heritage Center at Travis AFB, California.
 C-45H 52-10893 – at the National Museum of the USAF in Dayton, Ohio.
 UC-45J 09771 – at the National Museum of Naval Aviation in Pensacola, Florida. This aircraft was converted from the last civil Beech 18 built prior to WWII.
 UC-45J 23774 – at Laughlin AFB in Del Rio, Texas.
 RC-45J 51233 – at the Tennessee Museum of Aviation in Sevierville, Tennessee.
 UC-45J 51242 – at the CAF Central Texas Wing in San Marcos, Texas.
 UC-45J 51291 – at the Aerospace Museum of California in Sacramento, California.
 UC-45J 51338 – at the Minnesota Air National Guard Museum in St. Paul, Minnesota.
 S18D c/no. 178 – at the Beechcraft Heritage Museum in Tullahoma, Tennessee.
 D18S  c/no. A-935 – at the Beechcraft Heritage Museum at Tullahoma Regional Airport in Tullahoma, Tennessee.
 C-45H AF-824 –  at the Beechcraft Heritage Museum in Tullahoma, Tennessee.
 E18S c/no. BA-453 – at the Beechcraft Heritage Museum in Tullahoma, Tennessee.
 H18 c/no. BA-670 – at the Lone Star Flight Museum in Galveston, Texas.

Specifications (UC-45 Expeditor)

See also
Air Caribbean Flight 309

References

Notes

Bibliography
 Bridgeman, Leonard, ed. “The Beechcraft Expeditor.” Jane's Fighting Aircraft of World War II. London: Studio, 1946. .
 Bridgeman, Leonard. Jane's All The World's Aircraft 1951–52. London: Samson Low, Marston & Company, Ltd., 1951.
 Donald, David, ed.American Warplanes of World War II. London: Aerospace, 1995. .
 Griffin, John A. Canadian Military Aircraft Serials & Photographs 1920 - 1968. Ottawa: Queen's Printer, Publication No. 69-2, 1969.
 Hagedorn, Daniel P. Central American and Caribbean Air Forces. Tonbridge, UK: Air-Britain (Historians) Ltd., 1993. 
 Mesko, Jim. "The Rise...and Fall of the Vietnamese AF". Air Enthusiast, August–November 1981, No. 16. pp. 1–12, 78–80. .
 Mondey, David. American Aircraft of World War II (Hamlyn Concise Guide). London: Bounty Books, 2006. .
 Ogden, Bob. Aviation Museums and Collections of North America. Tonbridge, Kent, UK: Air-Britain (Historians) Ltd., 2007. .
 Pelletier, A. J. Beech Aircraft and their Predecessors. Annapolis, Maryland, USA: Naval Institute Press, 1995. .

 Pettipas, Leo. Canadian Naval Aviation 1945-1968. L. Pettipas/Canadian Naval Air Group, Winnipeg: 1986.  

 Swanborough, F. Gordon and Peter M. Bowers. United States Military Aircraft since 1909. London: Putnam, 1963.
 
 Taylor, John W. R. Jane's All The World's Aircraft 1961–62. London: Sampson Low, Marston & Company, 1961.
 Taylor, John W. R. Jane's All The World's Aircraft 1965–66. London: Sampson Low, Marston & Company, 1965.
 Taylor, John W. R. Jane's All The World's Aircraft 1967–68. London: Sampson Low, Marston & Company, 1967.
 Taylor, John W. R. Jane's All The World's Aircraft 1976–77. London: Jane's Yearbooks, 1976. .
 Taylor, John W. R. Jane's All the World's Aircraft 1982-83. London: Jane's Publishing Company, 1982. .
 United States Air Force Museum Guidebook. Wright-Patterson AFB, Ohio: Air Force Museum Foundation, 1975.

External links

 Experimental Aircraft Association (Chapter 1000) Beech E18S overview and pictorial tour 

0018
1930s United States military trainer aircraft
C-45, Beechcraft
1930s United States civil utility aircraft
World War II trainer aircraft of the United States
Aircraft first flown in 1937
Twin piston-engined tractor aircraft
Low-wing aircraft
Twin-tail aircraft